The NBA G League Ignite is a developmental basketball team in the NBA G League. Based in Henderson, Nevada, the team was designed to play exhibition games outside the G League's traditional scheduling as part of a one-year development program for elite National Basketball Association (NBA) prospects. Its roster is made up of both prospects and veteran players. Ignite was created on April 16, 2020, and is touted as an alternative to college basketball, offering prospects salaries of up to $500,000.

History
The NBA G League has been an avenue for high school, college and international prospects to be drafted into the NBA since 2008. On October 18, 2018, the G League introduced Select Contracts of $125,000 for elite prospects, including opportunities for basketball development, life skills, mentorship, and academic scholarships starting from the 2019–20 season. However, no players in the 2019 high school class signed a Select Contract. 

On April 16, 2020, the G League announced a raised salary for elite prospects and a one-year development program outside of its traditional team structure. The prospects would play alongside veteran players on a select team that would take part in training and 10 to 12 exhibition games against other G League teams, foreign national teams, and NBA academies. Players earn financial incentives for playing games, participating in community events, and attending life skills programs coordinated by the G League. They also receive a full scholarship to Arizona State University, which has partnered with the NBA.

On the same day that the G League's new development program was announced, Jalen Green, the highest ranked player in the 2020 high school class according to ESPN, became the first player to join the NBA G League Ignite, earning $500,000. The G League subsequently drew attention as an alternative to college basketball, with some media outlets speculating that Green's decision would threaten the National Collegiate Athletic Association. Green was soon joined on the team by fellow five-star recruits Isaiah Todd and Daishen Nix, both former college commits, as well as Kai Sotto of the Philippines. On June 9, 2020, former NBA player and coach Brian Shaw was named head coach of the Ignite. On July 16, Jonathan Kuminga, the highest ranked player in the 2021 high school class, reclassified to the 2020 class and signed with the Ignite. The name of the team, previously referred to as the G League Select Team, was announced as the NBA G League Ignite on September 2. On November 12, the Ignite signed veteran players Brandon Ashley, Bobby Brown, Cody Demps, Reggie Hearn, and Amir Johnson to play alongside and mentor the team's prospects. On January 14, 2021, the Ignite signed Donta Hall and Jarrett Jack.

The Ignite joined the 2020–21 season playing a full 15-game schedule in the single-site bubble tournament in Orlando, Florida, with 11 teams opting not to participate. In their first season, they put up an 8-7 record and entered the G League Playoffs in their first season, but they lost in the quarterfinal round to the Raptors 905.

In the Ignite's second season, they were only allowed to play in the Winter Showcase, an early-season tournament that allowed them and the Capitanes de Ciudad de México an opportunity to compete with other G League teams due to the reeling effects of the COVID-19 pandemic. This season was primarily led by new prospects Dyson Daniels from Australia, former Yakima Valley College student MarJon Beauchamp, and 5-star recruit Jaden Hardy. In the 12 games they were allowed to play in, the Ignite held a 6-6 record, which gave them a 4th place finish in the West Division but did not give them qualifications to compete any further in the Winter Showcase.

For their third season, the Ignite will move from Walnut Creek, California to the Las Vegas Valley to begin playing their home games at the Dollar Loan Center in Henderson, Nevada.

Season by season

Current roster

Drafted players

References

External links 

 

 
Basketball teams established in 2020
2020 establishments in California
Walnut Creek, California
Sports in Contra Costa County, California
Sports in Henderson, Nevada
Sports teams in Las Vegas